Fordyce is a small town in Dallas County, Arkansas, United States. Its population has been decreasing since the 1980's when the town reached an all time high of 5,175. The population in 2020 was 3,396  down from 4,300 at the 2010 census, and from 4,799 in 2000.

The city is the county seat, home to the 1911 Dallas County Courthouse.

Within Fordyce there are 19 sites listed on the National Register of Historic Places, including the Fordyce Home Accident Insurance Company. The town was named for Samuel W. Fordyce.

Geography
Fordyce is located in southeastern Dallas County, with the city's southern border following the Calhoun County line. U.S. Routes 79 and 167 bypass the city center to the north and west, while Arkansas Highway 8 passes through the downtown area. US 79 leads northeast  to Pine Bluff and southwest  to Camden, while US 167 leads north  to Sheridan and south  to El Dorado. AR 8 leads southeast  to Warren and northwest  to Arkadelphia.

Demographics

2020 census

As of the 2020 United States census, there were 3,396 people, 1,398 households, and 808 families residing in the city.

2010 census
As of the 2010 United States Census, there were 4,300 people living in the city. The racial makeup of the city was 53.3% Black, 42.0% White, 0.5% Native American, 0.2% Asian, <0.1% Pacific Islander, 0.1% from some other race and 1.1% from two or more races. 2.6% were Hispanic or Latino of any race.

2000 census
As of the census of 2000, there were 4,799 people, 1,737 households, and 1,186 families living in the city. The racial makeup of the city was 48.61% White, 49.66% Black or African American, 0.19% Native American, 0.42% Asian, 0.75% from other races, and 0.38% from two or more races. 1.19% of the population were Hispanic or Latino of any race.

There were 1,737 households, out of which 32.0% had children under the age of 18 living with them, 46.4% were married couples living together, 17.5% had a female householder with no husband present, and 31.7% were non-families. 28.6% of all households were made up of individuals, and 13.4% had someone living alone who was 65 years of age or older.  The average household size was 2.51 and the average family size was 3.09.

In the city, the population was spread out, with 28.5% under the age of 18, 8.9% from 18 to 24, 25.3% from 25 to 44, 21.0% from 45 to 64, and 16.3% who were 65 years of age or older.  The median age was 36 years. For every 100 females, there were 90.7 males.  For every 100 females age 18 and over, there were 87.1 males.

The median income for a household in the city was $23,297, and the median income for a family was $30,120. Males had a median income of $24,971 versus $15,553 for females. The per capita income for the city was $12,118.  About 16.2% of families and 22.3% of the population were below the poverty line, including 27.2% of those under age 18 and 19.3% of those age 65 or over.

Education 
The town was once segregated with separate public schools, the one for white children was the Fordyce Grammar School and the school for black children was the J. E. Wallace Elementary School. Public education is provided by the Fordyce School District. The city and surrounding area is served by and elementary, middle and Fordyce High School. The school's athletic teams are the Redbugs.

Notable people
The town of Fordyce and Dallas County have the highest number of inductees into the Arkansas Sports Hall of Fame in the state.

Anderson W. Atkinson, U.S. Air Force general
Jim Benton, pro football star in 1940s
Paul "Bear" Bryant, iconic coach in College Football Hall of Fame, attended Fordyce High School 
Cory Carr (born 1975), American-Israeli basketball player for Israeli team Elitzur Ramla B.C.
James Hal Cone, theologian
Scott Hutchins, author
Paul "PJ" Jackson, American film and video producer
Raylee Johnson, NFL player, defensive end for San Diego Chargers
Larry Lacewell, college football coach and director of scouting for Dallas Cowboys
Chris McNair, Alabama state legislator and businessman
Red Parker, college football coach 
Ray Phillips, NFL player, linebacker for Cincinnati Bengals and Philadelphia Eagles
Ray E. Porter, World War II general who won Purple Heart and Legion of Merit
John Thach, World War II naval aviator, later promoted to admiral 
Kevin Williams, NFL Pro Bowl defensive tackle for Minnesota Vikings
W. Randolph "Randy" Woodson, chancellor, North Carolina State University
Robin F. Wynne, associate justice, Supreme Court of Arkansas

Industry
Top employers:
 Georgia Pacific Corporation - Plywood Plant (355 employees as of 2008)
 Millcreek of Arkansas (270 employees as of 2008)
 Fordyce School District (197 employees as of 2008)
 Fordyce Picture Frames (160 employees as of 2008)
 International Paper Company (158 employees as of 2008)
 Georgia Pacific Corporation - OSB Plant (130 employees as of 2008)
 Dallas County Nursing Home (95 employees as of 2008)
 First Step, Incorporated (50 employees as of 2008)
 Transitech, Incorporated (50 employees as of 2008)

History
Before European settlement the area was inhabited by the Caddo people, whose artifacts are occasionally found. The land that became Fordyce was partially cleared prior to 1850 by W. W. Killabrew, an early settler. In the 1870's the land was owned by an African American named Henry Atkinson who sold it to Dr. Algernon Sidney Holderness for $118, who built the very first sawmill in town.

The town of the town of Fordyce was named for Samuel Wesley Fordyce. Little construction took place until 1881 when four railroad lines were constructed in the Dallas County, one of which was surveyed by Samuel Fordyce. The St. Louis Southwestern Railway Company was completed in 1883 under Fordyce's management, which he operated for sixteen years. The rail line called the Cotton Belt Line passed thru the town of Fordyce until 1940 when the rail lines were abandoned, and trucks on the roads replaced the trains.

By 1890 Fordyce was the largest town in the county and on April 8, 1908 it became incorporated  and the seat of Dallas County.

The Fordyce Lumber Co. was formed in February 1892 by Charles Warner Gates, John Wenzel Watzek and Edward Savage Crossett. Within four years of starting the Fordyce Lumber Co., the partners began the Crossett Lumber Co. in 1899. The city of Crossett is named after Edward Savage Crossett. On March 10, 1907, the Chicago, Rock Island and Pacific Railroad (CRI&PR) connected the town of Crossett to Fordyce. The (CRI&PR) allowed timber and lumber to move between the sawmills in Crossett to Fordyce that were owned by Charles Warner Gates, John Wenzel Watzek and Edward Savage Crossett.

The first high school football team in the state of Arkansas was started in Fordyce in 1904.

On July 5, 1975 The Rolling Stones band members Keith Richards and Ron Wood were arrested in Fordyce for reckless driving, carrying an illegal weapon- a hunting knife, and less than two grams of cocaine said to belong to a passenger in the car. They drank soda pop at the City Hall and called the British Embassy while a crowd gathered outside, but were released some hours later after paying $162.50 in bail and then they forfeited bond- not appearing on their court date.  31 years later in 2006 Richards was pardoned for the incident by the governor at the time Mike Huckabee.

References

External links

 
Cities in Dallas County, Arkansas
Cities in Arkansas
County seats in Arkansas